Dialing for Dingbats is a 1989 light-hearted romantic comedy directed by Peter Slodczyk and distributed by Troma Entertainment. The film follows the adventures of nerdy Randy, who, unable to score a girl in the real world, tries his hand at a '900' party line number.

Unusual for Troma comedies at the time, 'Dialing for Dingbats' features very little nudity.  It was cross-promoted in the background of a scene in Troma's Tromeo and Juliet where a poster of 'Dingbats' appears.

External links

1989 films
American independent films
Troma Entertainment films
1989 romantic comedy films
1989 independent films
1980s English-language films
1980s American films